Eddy D. Field Stadium is home of the Pepperdine University Waves' baseball team located in Malibu, California.  It was originally built in 1973, but underwent renovations in 1980 and 1999.  It now holds up to 2,000 spectators, all box seats.  It is well known for its picturesque setting which includes views of the Pacific Ocean, Catalina Island, and the Santa Monica Mountains.  College baseball writer Eric Sorenson of CBSSN ranked Eddy D. Field Stadium as the best college baseball stadium in Division I baseball.

Gallery

See also
 List of NCAA Division I baseball venues

References

External links

Eddy D. Field Stadium

College baseball venues in the United States
Baseball venues in California
Pepperdine Waves baseball
Sports venues completed in 1973
1973 establishments in California